Sunil Dnyandev Kamble is an Indian politician. He was elected to the Maharashtra Legislative Assembly from Pune Cantonment in the 2019 Maharashtra Legislative Assembly election as a member of Bharatiya Janata Party. He has previously served as Corporator in the Pune Municipal Corporation since 1992 - incumbent. He is known for his social work and direct approach. He was also elected as Standing Committee Chairperson of PMC in March 2019. He is the younger brother of 2 times BJP Minister Dilip Kamble. Coming from an extremely poor background, he emerged as a mass leader at a very young age. He began his social life as a young activist in ABVP. He played a pivotal role from the BJP side in campaigning and contacting on booth level in elections to the Balurghat Assembly constituency in West Bengal 2021 elections. Shri. Kamble currently is also a member of the legislative committee on Schedule Castes in the Maharashtra Legislature.

References 

1968 births
Living people
Bharatiya Janata Party politicians from Maharashtra
People from Pune
Maharashtra MLAs 2019–2024